This is a list of the 1966 PGA Tour Qualifying School graduates. The tournament was played over 144 holes at the PGA National Golf Club in Palm Beach Gardens, Florida in late October. The tournament represented the totality of the year's PGA Tour Qualifying School; there were no local or regional sections.

Tournament summary 
There were 99 players in the tournament and 32 earned their tour cards. Harry Toscano was medalist with a 4-under-par 572. The professional Marty Bohen was well within the cut-off entering the final day. However, he played poorly and failed to graduate by one shot. "I was destroyed," Bohen said later in life.

In general, according to Billy Booe, PGA Tournament Administrator, this class "was considered substantially stronger" than the inaugural class from the previous year. A full year after qualifying school, 12 players were still playing full-time on the PGA Tour.

List of graduates 

Sources:

References

PGA Tour Qualifying School
Golf in Florida
PGA Tour Qualifying School Graduates
PGA Tour Qualifying School Graduates